On 9 September 2012, car bomb exploded at the Saad al-Ansari district of the Syrian city of Aleppo, targeting al-Hayat hospital near the 7 April Stadium. 30 civilians and 2 members of the security forces were killed and at least 64 people were injured as a result of the car bomb blast.

See also
 List of bombings during the Syrian Civil War

References 

Terrorist incidents in Aleppo during the Syrian civil war
Suicide car and truck bombings in Syria
Terrorist incidents in Syria in 2012
September 2012 events in Syria
Attacks on buildings and structures in Syria